Public image may refer to:
Reputation
Reputation management
Public relations, maintaining a desirable public image for high-profile people and organizations
The Public Image, a novel by Muriel Spark
Public Image Ltd, a post-punk English musical group, with lead singer John Lydon of the Sex Pistols
Public Image (album), the debut album by Public Image Ltd
"Public Image" (song), by Public Image Ltd